Yakapınar (formerly: Misis) is a village in the District of Yüreğir, Adana Province, Turkey. It is the location of the ancient city of Mopsuestia.

References

Villages in Yüreğir District
Cilicia